Kris Angelica A. Dela Cruz (born January 2, 1999) is a Filipina singer and a television personality. In 2009, when she was only 10 years old, she became a contestant in noontime show Eat Bulaga's Birit Baby, and was declared first runner-up. Following her success, Kris Angelica signed exclusively as one of the VIVA Artist contracted talents and is co-managed by RED Models and Talents Manila.

Personal life
Kris Angelica Dela Cruz aka Kris Angelica is a Filipina singer from the Province of Laguna.

Career
In 2011, she was discovered by David Foster via the online talent search "Born to Sing" and was invited to perform at the "Hit Man Returns: David Foster & Friends" concert at the Araneta Coliseum. It was in 2012 when Kris Angelica became part of the RED Models and Talents Manila family and was able to perform and showcase her singing powers via MyPhone's Nationwide Tour. In her performance in Tacloban City with MyPhone's brand endorser Daniel Padilla, her video performance of Gloc 9's Hit "Sirena" became popular on Facebook, garnering almost 2 Million views within one day. RED Models and Talents Manila produced her first single and music video entitled "Nasaan Ka Na" in 2013.

In 2014, she was signed by VIVA Records and is now being co-managed by VIVA Artists Agency. Her debut single is set to release by May 2015.

On June 23, 2015, her official debut single was launched exclusively on Spotify under VIVA records entitled "Sabi-Sabi" which is written and composed by Thyro and Yumi, the genius songwriters behind the hit songs "Dati" by Sam Concepcion, "Hanap-Hanap" by James Reid , "Para-paraan" by Nadine Lustre, and Sarah Geronimo's "Ikot-Ikot" and "Kilometro."

In just 2 days after its release on Spotify, "Sabi-Sabi" has garnered more than 5,000 plays, a big number to hit for a new OPM artist in the said music streaming platform. A week after "Sabi-Sabi" has become the No. 1 single in Spotify Philippines Viral 50.

Discography

Singles

Filmography

Endorsement
My|Phone 2013–present
Oneway Salon
Mossimo

References

External links 

1999 births
Living people
Filipino dance musicians
Hip hop singers
Filipino women pop singers
Singers from Laguna (province)
Actresses from Laguna (province)
21st-century Filipino women singers
Women hip hop musicians